Shibata may refer to:

Places
 Shibata, Miyagi, a town in Miyagi Prefecture
 Shibata District, Miyagi, a district in Miyagi Prefecture
 Shibata, Niigata, a city in Niigata Prefecture
 Shibata Station (Niigata), a railway station in Niigata Prefecture
 Shibata Station (Aichi), a railway station in Aichi Prefecture

Other uses
Shibata (surname), a Japanese surname
Shibata clan, Japanese clan originating in the 12th century
Shibata coupler, Train Coupler